A. Maruthakasi (13 February 1920 – 29 November 1989) was an Indian poet and film lyricist who wrote mainly in the Tamil language. He penned more than 4000 lyrics in more than 250 Tamil films.

Early life 
Born in Melakudikadu in Tiruchirappalli district on 13 February 1920 to parents Ayyamperumal Udayar and Milagayi Ammal, he had his primary education in the local village school. He had his higher education at Government College, Kumbakonam.

After college, he wrote lyrics for the dramas staged by Devi Nadaga Sabha and to Mandirikumari a drama written by M. Karunanidhi. He also wrote lyrics for the drama company owned by Ka. Mu. Sheriff. The songs for the dramas were composed by Thiruchi Loganathan. Later, he joined as an assistant to Rajagopala Iyer, brother of Papanasam Sivan.

Career 
In 1949, Modern Theatres was producing a Tamil film. G. Ramanathan was the composer. During the song recording rehearsals, Thiruchi Loganathan sang a song penned by Maruthakasi. Producer T. R. Sundaram appreciated the meaning of the lyrics and gave a chance to Maruthakasi in the film. Pen Enum Maayap Peyaam... Poi Maadharai Yen Manam Naadumo is the first film lyric penned by Maruthakasi and the film Mayavathi released in 1949.

Since then he has written more than 4000 lyrics for more than 250 Tamil films. He had the ability to write lyrics to an already set tune.  As such, he has penned lyrics for many films dubbed from other language films.

When Modern Theatres decided to produce Alibabavum 40 Thirudargalum in 1956, T. R. Sundaram decided to use the same tunes set for the Hindi film of the same name. Udumalai Narayana Kavi was called to write the lyrics. But he declined saying that he will write lyrics for fresh tunes and recommended Maruthakasi. Maruthakasi wrote 9 songs for the set tunes.

One of his greatest hits, Neelavanna Kanna Vaadaa from the film (Mangaiyar Thilakam was first assigned to Kannadasan. But film-maker L. V. Prasad was not impressed by that song. He asked Maruthakasi to write the song and it became a big hit.

During the earlier decades of Tamil films, songs were written as per old Tamil literature. Maruthakasi is a foremost lyricist who started writing lyrics that could be understood by the common man.

Many of his lyrics have taken root in the hearts of audience.
Neelavanna Kanna Vaadaa (Mangaiyar Thilakam – 1955)
Sathiyame Latchiyamaayi Kollada (Neelamalai Thirudan – 1957)
Mullai Malar Mele (Uthama Puthiran – 1958)
Yer Munaikku Ner Inge Edhuvumeyille (Pillai Kani Amudhu – 1958)
Sirippu Idhan Sirappai (Raja Rani – 1956)

are some of his songs that still remain evergreen among Tamil film music lovers.

Personal life 
He married Dhanakodi Ammal in 1940. The couple have 6 sons and 3 daughters.

He encouraged young persons who were looking for a career in Tamil films.
When Vaali was looking for opportunities in the early sixties, he was given a chance to write a song for the film Nallavan Vazhvan. The recording of the song  was being postponed several times for various reasons. The producers thought the 'omen' was not good and asked Maruthakasi to write a song. Maruthakasi read Vaali's lyrics and told the producer that it is an excellent song and told the producer to record Vaali's song. The song was a hit.
When Modern Theatres in Salem produced Paasavalai in 1956, they invited Maruthakasi to write the lyrics. But Maruthakasi was busy in Chennai. He recommended Pattukkottai Kalyanasundaram for writing the lyrics.
In 1954 he recommended T. M. Soundararajan as a playback singer for the film Thookku Thookki to music director G. Ramanathan. T. M. Soundararajan went on to become a legend in Tamil film music.

After 1960s most of the producers sought Kannadasan as lyricist for their films. Maruthakasi did not get much opportunities. He tried to produce films but sustained losses so he returned to his village. M. G. Ramachandran called him back to Chennai and made him to write lyrics for all films produced by Devar films. Maruthakasi wrote lyrics for films produced by K. S. Gopalakrishnan.

Works 
His works have been made public by the State government of Tamil Nadu.

As a Lyricist

The following list is incomplete.

Death 
He died on 29 November 1989.

References

External links 
Maruthakasi Lyrics
Maruthakasi Songs
 (in Tamil) by Vamanan
Centenary of lyricist Maruthakasi ignored

Tamil film poets
Indian male poets
People from Tiruchirappalli district
1920 births
1989 deaths